Nam Tau  is a khum (commune) of Phnom Srok District in Banteay Meanchey Province in western Cambodia.

Villages

 Rongvean
 Thmei Khang Tboung
 Thmei Khang Cheung
 Kouk Yeang
 Kouk Chas
 Chrab
 Kantuot
 Nam Tau
 Pongro
 Samraong
 Khnang
 Thnong Khang Tboung
 Thnong Khang Cheung
 Slaeng
 Ta Kong
 Yeang Otdam
 Ampel Kaong
 Kung Seim

References

Communes of Banteay Meanchey province
Phnom Srok District